This is a list of the association football competitions past and present for international teams and for club football, in individual countries and internationally. Confirmed future competitions are also included.

The competitions are grouped by organising authority: the FIFA (international association), the six confederations (continental associations), and the federations (national associations)

For more information about each year, season, and other, see: Association football by year, Seasons in association football and Association football

Intercontinental competitions
This section lists the worldwide and intercontinental competitions ruled by the FIFA, by two or more confederations or by two or more federations member of different confederations.

 National teams 

 Worldwide 
FIFA World Cup: Final tournament determined by Qualifiers held within the six FIFA continental zones.
FIFA Women's World Cup: Women's
Olympic Football Tournament: defunct for male senior teams
FIFA Confederations Cup: defunct

 Intercontinental 
Panamerican Championship defunct
Afro-Asian Cup of Nations defunct
CONMEBOL–UEFA Cup of Champions: previously known officially as the European/South American Nations Cup and commonly as the Artemio Franchi Cup (Artemio Franchi Trophy); the ceremonial match between winners of Copa America and UEFA European Championship. It was revived in 2022, also referred to as a Finalissima (Finalísima).
Women's Finalissima: Women's
AFC/OFC Challenge Cup defunct

 Invitational tournaments 
Invitational tournaments are competitions that feature a cup, sometimes holding the name of the host country. The host country invites other nations to participate in the tournament.

Aisha Buhari Cup： Women's
Albena Cup： Women's, defunct
Algarve Cup: Women's
Algeria International Football Tournament
Aphrodite Women Cup：Women's
Arnold Clark Cup: Women's
Australia Bicentenary Gold Cup defunct
Balaton Cup： Women's
Balkan Cup defunct
Bangabandhu Cup
Brazil Independence Cup defunct
Canada Cup defunct
China Cup defunct
Corsica Football Cup defunct
Coupe de l'Outre-Mer defunct
CTFA International Tournament defunct
Cyprus Women's Cup: Women's
Cyprus International Football Tournament defunct
FA Summer Tournament defunt
FFA Cup of Nations：Women's
Flying Officers Cup Women's
Four Nations Tournament (China) defunct
Four Nations Tournament (Zambia)
Four Nations Tournament: Women's
Friendship Tournament defunct
Fuchs International Tournament defunct
Hassan II Trophy defunct
Indonesian Independence Cup defunct
England Challenge Cup defunct
Intercontinental Cup (India)
International Friendship Championship defunct
Istria Cup: Women's
Jakarta Anniversary Tournament defunct
Korea Cup defunct
King's Cup
Kirin Cup Soccer: Invitational tournament / Kirin Challenge Cup: International friendly match
Kuneitra Cup defunct
LG Cup defunct
Lunar New Year Cup
Malta women's tournament: Women's, defunct
Merlion Cup defunct
Mundialito ： Women's, defunct
Nehru Cup defunct
Nordic Football Championship defunct
Peace Queen Cup Women's, defunct
Pestabola Merdeka
Pinatar Cup: Women's
Rous Cup defunct
SheBelieves Cup: Women's
South Vietnam Independence Cup defunct
Sud Ladies Cup：Women's
Taça das Nações defunct
Tournament of Nations: Women's, defunct
Torneio Internacional de Futebol Feminino ： Women's
Tournoi de France ： Women's
Turkish Women's Cup: Women's
Umbro Cup defunct
Unity Cup defunct
U.S.A. Bicentennial Cup Tournament defunct
VFF Cup
Women's Baltic Cup：Women's
Women's World Invitational Tournament Women's, defunct
Yongchuan International Tournament: Women's

 Arab 

FIFA Arab Cup
Pan Arab Games
Palestine Cup: defunct
Arab Women's Cup: Women's
Arab Cup U-20: Under-20

 Muslim 
Islamic Solidarity Games

 National youth teams 

FIFA U-20 World Cup: under-20 men
FIFA U-17 World Cup: under-17 men
FIFA U-20 Women's World Cup: under-20 women
FIFA U-17 Women's World Cup: under-17 women
Summer Universiade
Youth Olympic Football Tournament 
Danone Nations Cup: between the ages of 10 and 12
International Youth Soccer in Niigata: Under-17, defunct
Montaigu Tournament: Under-16
Panda Cup defunct
SBS Cup 
Sendai Cup: Under-19, defunct
SuperCupNI defunct?
Tournoi Maurice Revello: Maurice Revello Tournament ; Commonly known as Toulon Tournament

 Clubs 

 Worldwide 

FIFA Club World Cup: tournament between the winners of that year's AFC, CAF, CONCACAF, CONMEBOL, OFC and UEFA, along with the host nation's national league champions.

 Intercontinental 

 Intercontinental Cup: defunct competition endorsed between UEFA and CONMEBOL ; known as Toyota European/South American Cup (abbreviated as Toyota Cup) from 1980 to 2004.
 Copa Interamericana: defunct. between CONCACAF and CONMEBOL
 Afro-Asian Club Championship: defunct. between AFC and CAF
 International Women's Club Championship: Women's
 Intercontinental Futsal Cup: Futsal

 Pre-season friendly / invitational tournaments 

Amsterdam Tournament
ANFA Cup
Audi Cup
BTV Cup
Copa del Sol: 2010–2014 (defunct)
Dubai Cup
Edmonton Cup
Emirates Cup
Eusébio Cup
Florida Cup
Football World Championship: defunct
Friendship Trophy
Geoff Harvey Memorial Vase: 4-team tournament presented by Corinthian-Casuals F.C.
Global Tour for Peace
HKFC Soccer Sevens
International Champions Cup
J.League Asia Challenge
J.League World Challenge
La Manga Cup: winter tournament 1999–2015 (defunct); Usual between clubs from countries with a summer football season (Sweden, Finland, Denmark, Norway, Russia, Ukraine, United States and Canada)
Lunar New Year Cup
Maradona Cup: scheduled to start in 2021
Marbella Cup: 2004–2017 (defunct)
MLS All-Star Game
Peace Cup
Premier League Asia Trophy
Queen's Cup: defunct
Ramón de Carranza Trophy
Russian Railways Cup
Saitama City Cup
Sydney Super Cup
Telekom Cup: Originally, only Bundesliga teams participated.
Teresa Herrera Trophy
The Women's Cup: Women's
Trofeo Colombino
Trofeo Joan Gamper
Trofeo Santiago Bernabéu
Uhrencup
Vodacom Challenge
Wembley Cup: defunct
Wembley International Tournament
Women's International Champions Cup: Women's
World Football Challenge

 Arab 

Arab Club Champions Cup
GCC Champions League
Arab Cup Winners' Cup: defunct
Arab Super Cup: defunct

 Japanese-South American 

 J.League Cup / Copa Sudamericana Championship

 Saudi-Egyptian 
 Saudi-Egyptian Super Cup
 Lusail Super Cup

 Youth teams 

Alkass International Cup: Under-17
Balcom BMW CUP Prayer for Peace; Hiroshima International Youth Soccer Games 
Dallas Cup
Gothia Cup 
J.League International Youth Cup
Manchester United Premier Cup
Montaigu Tournament: Under-16
Otten Cup
Torneo di Viareggio

AFC (Asian competitions)
This section lists the competitions ruled by the AFC (Asian Football Confederation), or by federations member the AFC.

National teams
 AFC competitions 

AFC Asian Cup: 1st-tier cup ; Qualification is linked with AFC Asian Qualifiers for the FIFA World Cup.
AFC Solidarity Cup: 2nd-tier cup
AFC Challenge Cup: defunct
AFC U23 Asian Cup: Linked with Qualifiers for the Men's Olympic Football Tournament.
AFC U20 Asian Cup
AFC U17 Asian Cup
AFC Women's Asian Cup: Women's cup ; Linked with Qualifiers for the FIFA Women's World Cup.
AFC Women's Olympic Qualifying Tournament: Women's
AFC U20 Women's Asian Cup: Women's
AFC U17 Women's Asian Cup: Women's
Asian Games

 Sub-federation competitions 

AFF Championship
CAFA Championship
EAFF E-1 Football Championship (men) / (women)
SAFF Championship
WAFF Championship
AFF–EAFF Champions Trophy: Not yet held
Arabian Gulf Cup: Hosted by the AGCFF
East Asian Games: defunct
East Asian Youth Games
South Asian Games
Southeast Asian Games
West Asian Games
Three Nations Cup: Hosted by the KFU defunct
Three Nations Cup: Hosted by the ANFA defunct

Clubs
 AFC competitions 
AFC Champions League: 1st-tier cup
AFC Cup: 2nd-tier cup
Asian Cup Winners' Cup: defunct
AFC President's Cup: defunct
Asian Super Cup: defunct
Afro-Asian Club Championship: defunct
AFC Women's Club Championship: Women's

 Sub-federation competitions 

GCC Champions League
WAFF Champions League
ASEAN Club Championship
Sheikh Kamal International Club Cup
Mekong Club Championship 
WAFF Women's Clubs Championship: Women's

Afghanistan

Australia

Bahrain

Bangladesh

Bhutan

Leagues
Bhutan Premier League: 1st-tier
Bhutan Super League: 2nd-tier
Dzongkhag (District) League: 3rd-tier

Cups
 Jigme Dorji Wangchuk Memorial Gold Cup: National cup

Brunei

Leagues
Brunei Super League: 1st-tier
District leagues: 2nd-tier
Brunei Premier League: defunct

Cups
Brunei FA Cup: National cup
Brunei Super Cup: Super cup
Borneo Cup: defunct

Cambodia

Leagues
Cambodian Premier League: 1st-tier
Cambodian League 2: 2nd-tier

Cups
Hun Sen Cup: National cup
CNCC Charity Cup: Super cup
CNCC League Cup: League Cup
FFC Cup
FFC Challenge Cup

China PR

Guam

Leagues
 Guam Soccer League: 1st-tier
Division 1
Division 2

Cups
 Guam FA Cup: National cup

Hong Kong

Leagues
 Hong Kong Premier League: 1st-tier
 First Division: 2nd-tier
 Second Division: 3rd-tier
 Third Division: 4th-tier

Cups
 Hong Kong Community Cup: Super cup
 Hong Kong FA Cup: National cup
 Hong Kong FA Cup Junior Division: Lower cup
 Senior Shield: National cup
 Sapling Cup: League cup
 Viceroy Cup: defunct
 Hong Kong League Cup: defunct

India

All India Football Federation
 All India Football Federation: League management and operation

Men's Competitions

Leagues
  Indian Super League: 1st-tier
  I-League: 2nd-tier (started as National Football League)
  I-League 2: 3rd-tier

Cups
  AIFF Super Cup: National cup (Previously as Federation Cup)
  Durand Cup
 IFA Shield
 Rovers Cup: defunct
  Indian Super Cup: defunct

Youth League
 Elite League
  Youth League: U18
  Juniors League: U15
  Sub-Juniors League: U13

Futsal
  Futsal Club Championship

International domestic competition
  Intercontinental Cup
  Nehru Cup: defunct

Inter-state national competition
Santosh Trophy

Regional Leagues

Women's Competitions

Leagues
  Indian Women's League

Inter-state national competition
Indian Women's National Championship

Regional Leagues

Indonesia

Iran

Iraq

Leagues
Iraqi Premier League: 1st-tier
Iraq Division One: 2nd-tier
Iraq Division Two: 3rd-tier
Iraq Division Three: 4th-tier

Cups
Iraq FA Cup: National cup
Iraqi Super Cup: Super cup

Defunct
Iraqi Elite Cup
Iraqi National First Division
Iraq FA Baghdad Cup
Iraq Central FA First Division
Iraq Central FA Second Division
Iraq Central FA Third Division
Iraq Central FA Fourth Division
Iraq Central FA Perseverance Cup
Iraq Central FA Second Division Perseverance Cup
Independent Baghdad Tournament
Iraq FA Basra First Division
Iraq FA Basra Second Division
Iraq FA Basra Third Division
Iraq FA Kirkuk First Division
Iraq FA Kirkuk Second Division
Iraq FA Mosul League

Japan

Jordan

Leagues
Jordanian Pro League: 1st-tier
Jordan League Division 1: 2nd-tier

Cups
FA Cup: National cup
Super Cup: Super cup 
FA Shield: Pre-season cup

Kuwait

Leagues
Kuwait Premier League: 1st-tier 
Kuwaiti Division One: 2nd-tier

Cups
Kuwait Emir Cup: National cup
Kuwait Crown Prince Cup: National cup
Kuwait Federation Cup: League cup
Kuwait Super Cup: Super cup
Al Kurafi Cup: defunct

Kyrgyzstan

Leagues
Kyrgyz Premier League: 1st-tier
Kyrgyz First League: 2nd-tier 
Qyrğyz Ekinçi Ligasy: 3rd-tier

Cups
Kyrgyzstan Cup: National cup 
Kyrgyzstan Super Cup: Super cup

Laos

Leagues
Lao League 1: 1st-tier
Lao League 2: 2nd-tier

Cups
Laotian Prime Minister's Cup 
Lao FF Cup: National cup
Lao FF Super Cup

Lebanon

Leagues
Lebanese Premier League: 1st-tier
Lebanese Second Division: 2nd-tier
Lebanese Third Division: 3rd-tier
Lebanese Fourth Division: 4th-tier
Lebanese Fifth Division: 5th-tier

Cups
Lebanese FA Cup: National cup
Lebanese Super Cup: Super cup
Lebanese Elite Cup
Lebanese Challenge Cup
Lebanese Federation Cup: defunct

Macau

Leagues
 Liga de Elite: 1st-tier
 Campeonato da 2ª Divisão do Futebol: 2nd-tier
Campeonato da 3ª Divisão do Futebol: 3rd-tier

Cups
 Taça de Macau em futebol: National cup

Malaysia

Leagues
Malaysia Super League: 1st-tier
Malaysia Premier League: 2nd-tier
Malaysia M3 League: 3rd-tier
Malaysia M4 League: 4th-tier

Cups
 Malaysia FA Cup: National Cup
 Piala Sumbangsih: Super cup
 Malaysia Cup: Domestic Cup
 Malaysia Challenge Cup: Domestic Cup
 Malaysia FAM Cup: Domestic Cup
 Airmarine Cup: National Team Cup
 Merdeka Cup: National Team Cup

Maldives

Leagues
Dhivehi Premier League: 1st-tier
Second Division: 2nd-tier
Third Division: 3rd-tier

Cups
FA Cup: National cup
President's Cup
FA Charity Shield: Super cup

Mongolia

Leagues
 Mongolian National Premier League: 1st-tier
 Mongolian First League: 2nd-tier
 Mongolia Second League: 3rd-tier
 National Amateur Cup: 4th-tier

Cups
MFF Cup: National cup
MFF Super Cup: Super cup

Myanmar

Nepal

Leagues
Martyr's Memorial A-Division League: 1st-tier
Martyr's Memorial B-Division League: 2nd-tier
Martyr's Memorial C-Division League: 3rd-tier

Cups
Aaha Gold Cup
Budda Subba Gold Cup
Pokhara Cup
Simara Gold Cup
Udayapur Gold Cup
Ncell Cup: National cup
Birat Gold Cup

Northern Mariana Islands

Leagues
M★League: 1st-tier
M*League Division 2

North Korea

Leagues
DPR Korea Premier Football League: 1st-tier
: 2nd-tier
: 3rd-tier
Technical Innovation Contests: defunct

Cups
Hwaebul Cup: National cup
Man'gyŏngdae Prize
Osandŏk Prize
Paektusan Prize
Poch'ŏnbo Torch Prize
Republican Championship

Oman

Leagues
 Oman Professional League: 1st-tier
 Oman First Division League: 2nd-tier
   Oman Second Division League: 3rd-tier

Cups
 Sultan Qaboos Cup: National cup
 Super Cup: Super cup
 Oman Professional League Cup 
 Omani Prince Cup: defunct

Palestine

Leagues
 Gaza Strip Premier League: 1st-tier
 Gaza Strip First League: 2nd-tier
 Gaza Strip Second League: 3rd-tier
 West Bank Premier League: 1st-tier
 West Bank First League: 2nd-tier
 West Bank Second League: 3rd-tier

Cups
 Palestine Cup: National cup 
Gaza Strip Cup
West Bank Cup
Gaza Strip Super Cup: Super cup
West Bank Super Cup: Super cup
Yasser Arafat Cup: Domestic cup

Pakistan

Leagues
Pakistan Premier League: Premier Division
PFF League: 2nd Division
Karachi Football League: 4th Division
KASB Premier League Karachi: based City league
 Geo Super Football League: Defunct

Cups
Pakistan National Football Challenge Cup: National cup

Philippines

Qatar

Saudi Arabia

Singapore

South Korea

 Sri Lanka 

Leagues

 S1 League: 1st-tier
 Kit Premier League Division I: 2nd-tier
 Kit Premier League Division II: 3rd-tier

Cups

 Sri Lanka FA Cup: National cup

 Syria 

Leagues

 Syrian Premier League: 1st-tier
 Syrian League 1st Division: 2nd-tier
 Syrian League 2nd Division: 3rd-tier

Cups

 Syrian Cup: National cup 
 Syrian Super Cup: Super cup

Taiwan (Chinese Taipei)

 Tajikistan 

Leagues
 Vysshaya Liga: 1st-tier
 Tajikistan First League: 2nd-tier
 Tajikistan Second League: 3rd-tier
 Tajikistan Regional Leagues: 4th-tier

Cups

 Tajikistan Cup: National cup
 Tajikistan Super Cup: Super cup
 TFF Cup: Pre-season cup

Thailand

Thai League 3 and Thai League 4 are now restructuring for the upcoming football season in September 2020.

Timor-Leste

Leagues
Liga Futebol Timor-Leste
Liga Futebol Amadora Primeira Divisão: 1st-tier
Liga Futebol Amadora Segunda Divisão: 2nd-tier
Liga Futebol Amadora Terceira Divisão: 3rd-tier

Cups

 Taça 12 de Novembro: National cup
 LFA Super Taça: Super cup

 Turkmenistan 

Leagues

 Turkmenistan Higher League: 1st-tier
 Turkmenistan First League: 2nd-tier

Cups

 Turkmenistan Cup: National cup
 Turkmenistan Super Cup: Super cup

 United Arab Emirates 

Leagues
UAE Pro League: 1st-tier 
UAE First Division League: 2nd-tier
UAE Second Division League: 3rd-tier

Cups
UAE President's Cup: National cup
UAE League Cup: League cup
UAE Super Cup: Super cup

 Uzbekistan 

Leagues

 Uzbekistan Super League: 1st-tier
 Uzbekistan Pro League: 2nd-tier
 Uzbekistan Pro-B League: 3rd-tier
 Uzbekistan Second League: 4th-tier
 Uzbekistan Regional Championships: 5th and below

Cups

 Uzbekistan Cup: National cup
 Uzbekistan League Cup: League cup
 Uzbekistan Super Cup: Super cup
 Uzbekistan PFL Cup

Vietnam

Leagues
 V.League 1: 1st-tier 
 V.League 2: 2nd-tier 
 Vietnamese League Two: 3rd-tier 
 Vietnamese League Three: 4rd-tier 
 Vietnamese Women's Football Championship

Cups
 Vietnamese National Football Cup: National cup
 Vietnamese Super Cup: Super cup

 Yemen 

Leagues

 Yemeni League: 1st-tier
 Yemeni Second Division: 2nd-tier

Cups

 Yemeni President Cup: National cup
 Yemeni Super Cup: Super cup

CAF (African competitions)
This section lists the competitions ruled by the Confederation of African Football (CAF), or by federation members of the CAF.

National teams
Africa Cup of Nations
African Nations Championship
Afro-Asian Cup of Nations: defunct
Africa U-23 Cup of Nations: Linked with Qualifiers for the Men's Olympic Football Tournament.
Africa U-20 Cup of Nations 
Africa U-17 Cup of Nations 
Africa Women Cup of Nations: Women's cup ; Linked with Qualifiers for the FIFA Women's World Cup.
CAF Women's Olympic Qualifying Tournament: Women's
African U-20 Women's World Cup qualification: Women's
African U-17 Cup of Nations for Women: Women's
African Games

 Sub-federation competitions 

CECAFA Cup
COSAFA Cup
COSAFA Women's Championship: Women's
WAFU Nations Cup
U-17 UNIFFAC Cup 
UNAF U-23 Tournament 
CEMAC Cup: defunct
Amílcar Cabral Cup: defunct

Clubs
CAF Champions League: 1st-tier cup
CAF Confederation Cup: 2nd-tier cup
CAF Super Cup: Super cup
CAF Women's Champions League: Women's
CAF Cup: defunct
African Cup Winners' Cup: defunct
Afro-Asian Club Championship: defunct

 Sub-federation competitions 

UNAF Nessma Cup
West African Club Championship
CECAFA Club Cup

Algeria

Angola

 Benin 

Leagues

Benin Premier League: 1st-tier
Benin Second Division: 2nd-tier

Cups

Benin Cup: National cup 
Benin Super Cup: Super cup

 Botswana 

Leagues

Botswana Premier League: 1st-tier
Botswana First Division North: 2nd-tier
Botswana First Division South: 2nd-tier
Botswana Division One: 3rd-tier

Cups

FA Challenge Cup (Botswana): National cup
Botswana Independence Cup
Orange Kabelano Charity Cup
Mascom Top 8 Cup: Cup (Top 8 of 1st-tier League)

 Burkina Faso 

Leagues

Burkinabé Premier League: 1st-tier

Cups

Coupe du Faso: National cup
Burkinabé SuperCup: Super cup

 Burundi 

Leagues

Burundi Premier League: 1st-tier

Cups

Burundian Cup: National cup
Burundi Super Cup: Super cup

 Cameroon 

Leagues
Championnat du Cameroun de football: 1st-tier
Cameroon Deuxième Division: 2nd-tier

Cups

Cameroon Cup: National cup
Super Coupe Roger Milla: Super cup

 Cape Verde 

Leagues

Cape Verdean Football Championship: 1st-tier
Santiago South Premier Division

Cups

Cape Verdean Cup: National cup
Cape Verdean Super Cup: Super cup
Cape Verde Independence Cup

 Central African Republic 

Leagues

Central African Republic League: 1st-tier
Central African Republic League D2: 2nd-tier

Cups

Coupe Nationale: National cup
Central African Republic Supercoupe: Super cup

 Chad 

Leagues

Chad Premier League: 1st-tier
Chad Division 2: 2nd-tier

Cups

Chad Cup: National cup
Chad Super Cup: Super cup
Coupe de Ligue de N'Djaména

 Comoros 

Leagues

Comoros Premier League: 1st-tier
Mwali league
Ndzuwani league
Ngazidja league

Cups

Comoros Cup: National cup
Comoros Super Cup: Super cup

 Congo 

Leagues

Congo Premier League: 1st-tier

Cups

Coupe du Congo: National cup
Super Coupe du Congo: Super cup

 DR Congo 

Leagues

Linafoot: 1st-tier
Linafoot Ligue 2: 2nd-tier

Cups

Coupe du Congo: National cup
Super Coupe du Congo: Super cup

 Djibouti 

Leagues

Djibouti Premier League: 1st-tier

Cups

Djibouti Cup: National cup
Djibouti Super Cup: Super cup

Egypt

 Equatorial Guinea 

Leagues

Equatoguinean Primera División: 1st-tier
Equatorial Guinea Segunda División: 2nd-tier

Cups

Equatoguinean Cup: National cup
Equatoguinean SuperCup: Super cup

 Eritrea 

Leagues

Eritrean Premier League: 1st-tier

Cups

Eritrean Cup: National cup

Eswatini

Leagues

Premier League of Eswatini: 1st-tier

Cups

Swazi Cup: National cup
Swazi Charity Cup: Super cup

 Ethiopia 

Leagues

Ethiopian Premier League: 1st-tier
Ethiopian Higher League: 2nd-tier
Ethiopian First League: 3rd-tier

Cups

Ethiopian Cup: National cup 
Addis Ababa City Cup
Ethiopian Super Cup: Super cup

 Gabon 

Leagues

Gabon Championnat National D1: 1st-tier
Gabon Championnat National D2: 2nd-tier

Cups

Coupe du Gabon Interclubs: National cup 
Supercoupe du Gabon: Super cup

 The Gambia 

Leagues

GFA League First Division: 1st-tier
GFA League Second Division: 2nd-tier
GFA League Third Division: 3rd-tier

Cups

Gambian Cup: National cup
Gambian Super Cup: Super cup

 Ghana 

Leagues
Ghana Premier League: 1st-tier
Ghana Football Leagues: 2nd/3rd/4th-tier

Cups

Ghanaian FA Cup: National cup
Ghana Super Cup: Super cup

 Guinea 

Leagues

Guinée Championnat National: 1st-tier

Cups

Guinée Coupe Nationale: National cup
Supercoupe de Guinée: Super cup

 Guinea-Bissau 

Leagues

Campeonato Nacional da Guiné-Bissau: 1st-tier

Cups

Taça Nacional da Guiné Bissau: National cup
SuperTaça Nacional da Guiné-Bissau: Super cup

 Ivory Coast 

Leagues
Ligue 1: 1st-tier
Ligue 2: 2nd-tier
Championnat Division 3: 3rd-tier
Division Regionale

Cups

Coupe de Côte d'Ivoire de football: National cup
Coupe Houphouët-Boigny: Super cup

 Kenya 

Leagues

Kenyan Premier League: 1st-tier
Kenyan National Super League: 2nd-tier
FKF Division One: 3rd-tier
Kenyan Regional Leagues: 4th-tier
Kenyan County Champions League: 5th-tier
Kenyan Sub-County Leagues: 6th-tier

Cups

FKF President's Cup: National cup
Kenyan Super Cup: Super cup
KPL Top 8 Cup: Cup (Top 8 of 1st-tier League)

 Lesotho 

Leagues

Lesotho Premier League: 1st-tier
Lesotho A Division: 2nd-tier

Cups

Lesotho Independence Cup: National cup
MGC Supa 8

 Liberia 

Leagues

Liberian First Division: 1st-tier
Liberian Second Division League: 2nd-tier
LFA Sub-Committee League: 3rd-tier

Cups

Liberian Cup: National cup
Liberian National County Meet
Liberian Super Cup: Super cup

 Libya 

Leagues

Libyan Premier League: 1st-tier
Libyan Second Division: 2nd-tier
Libyan Third Division: 3rd-tier
Libyan Fourth Division: 4th-tier

Cups

Libyan Cup: National cup
Libyan League Cup
Libyan Super Cup: Super cup

 Madagascar 

Leagues

Malagasy Pro League: 1st-tier

Cups

Coupe de Madagascar: National cup
Super Coupe de Madagascar: Super cup

 Malawi 

Leagues

Malawi Premier Division: 1st-tier
SRF League
FMB Under 20 Youth League

Cups

Malawi Carlsberg Cup
FISD Challenge Cup: National cup
Malawi Presidential Cup
Malawi Charity Shield

 Mali 

Leagues

Malian Première Division: 1st-tier
Malian Division 1: 2nd-tier

Cups

Malian Cup: National cup 
Super Coupe National du Mali: Super cup

 Mauritania 

Leagues

Ligue 1 Mauritania: 1st-tier
Ligue 2 Mauritania: 2nd-tier

Cups

Coupe du Président de la République: National cup 
Mauritanian Super Cup: Super cup

 Mauritius 

Leagues

Mauritian League: 1st-tier
Mauritian First Division: 2nd-tier

Cups

Mauritian Cup: National cup
Mauritian Republic Cup
Millenium Cup
Ram Ruhee Memorial Cup
MFA Super Cup: Super cup

Morocco

Mozambique

Leagues

Moçambola: 1st-tier

Cups

Taça de Moçambique: National cup
Supertaça de Moçambique: Super cup

 Namibia 

Leagues

Namibia Premier League: 1st-tier
Namibia First Division: 2nd-tier
Namibia Women's Super League

Cups

Namibia FA Cup: National cup
Namibian Newspaper Cup: Youth cup
Namibia Super Cup: Super cup

 Niger 

Leagues

Niger Premier League: 1st-tier

Cups

Niger Cup: National cup
Niger Super Cup: Super cup

 Nigeria 

Leagues

Nigerian Professional Football League: 1st-tier
Nigeria National League: 2nd-tier
Nigeria Nationwide League: 3rd-tier
Nigeria Amateur League Division Two: 4th-tier
Nigerian Nationwide League Division Three: 5th-tier

Cups

Nigerian FA Cup: National cup
Nigerian Super Cup: Super cup
Super 4 (Nigeria)

 Réunion 

Leagues

Réunion Premier League: 1st-tier

Cups

Coupe de la Réunion: National cup
Coupe de France

 Rwanda 

Leagues

Rwanda Premier League: 1st-tier
Rwandan Second Division: 2nd-tier
Rwandan Third Division: 3rd-tier
Rwanda Women's Football League

Cups

Rwandan Cup: National cup
Rwandan Super Cup: Super cup

 São Tomé and Príncipe 

Leagues

São Tomé and Príncipe Championship: 1st-tier
São Tomé Island League
Príncipe Island League

Cups

Taça Nacional de São Tomé e Principe: National cup
São Tomé Island Cup
Príncipe Island Cup
São Tomé and Príncipe Super Cup

 Senegal 

Leagues

Senegal Premier League: 1st-tier
Senegal Ligue 1
Senegal Ligue 2
Senegal Nationale 1
Senegal Nationale 2

Cups

Senegal FA Cup: National cup
Senegalese Super Cup: Super cup
Senegalese League Cup

 Seychelles 

Leagues

Seychelles First Division: 1st-tier
Seychelles Division Two: 2nd-tier
Seychelles Division Three: 3rd-tier

Cups

Airtel Cup
Seychelles FA Cup: National cup

 Sierra Leone 

Leagues

Sierra Leone National Premier League: 1st-tier
Sierra Leone FA Division One: 2nd-tier
Sierra Leone FA Division Two: 3rd-tier

Cups

Sierra Leonean FA Cup: National cup
Sierra Leonean Charity Shield

 Somalia 

Leagues

Somali First Division: 1st-tier
Somali Second Division: 2nd-tier
Somali Third Division: 3rd-tier
Somalia Fourth League: 4th-tier

Cups

Somalia Cup: National cup
Somalia Super Cup: Super cup

South Africa

Leagues

Premier Soccer League: Leagues administrator
South African Premier Division: 1st-tier
National First Division: 2nd-tier
SAFA Second Division: 3rd-tier
SAFA Regional League: 4th-tier

Cups

Telkom Knockout: Defunct
Nedbank Cup: National cup
MTN 8

 South Sudan 

Leagues

South Sudan Football Championship: 1st-tier
South Sudan Premier League: 2nd-tier

Cups

South Sudan National Cup: National cup
S.S.D Super Cup: Super cup

 Sudan 

Leagues

Sudan Premier League: 1st-tier
Khartoum League (defunct)Cups

Sudan Cup: National cup
Sudan Super Cup: Super cup

 Tanzania 

Leagues

Tanzanian Premier League: 1st-tier
Tanzanian First Division League: 2nd-tier
Tanzanian Second Division League: 3rd-tier

Cups

Tanzania FA Cup: National cup 
Tanzania Community Shield

 Togo 

Leagues

Championnat National de Premiere Division: 1st-tier

Cups

Coupe du Togo: National cup
Supercoupe du Togo: Super cup

 Tunisia 

 Uganda 

Leagues

Uganda Premier League: 1st-tier
FUFA Big League: 2nd-tier
Ugana Regional Leagues: 3rd-tier

Cups

Ugandan Cup: National cup 
Uganda Super 8 Cup

 Zambia 

Leagues

Zambia Super League: 1st-tier
Zambia National Division One: 2nd-tier

Cups

Zambian Cup: National cup
Zambian Independence Cup: defunct
Northern Rhodesia Castle Cup: defunct
 ABSA Cup
 Zambian Challenge Cup
 Zambian Coca-Cola Cup
 Zambian Charity Shield: Super cup

Zanzibar

Leagues

Zanzibar Premier League: 1st-tier

Cups

Zanzibar Cup: National cup 
Zanzibari Charity Shield

 Zimbabwe 

Leagues

Zimbabwe Premier Soccer League: 1st-tier
Zimbabwe Division 1: 2nd-tier
Zimbabwe Third Division: 3rd-tier

Cups

Zimbabwean Independence Trophy
Cup of Zimbabwe: National cup 
BancABC Super8 Cup
NetOne Charity Shield
Bob 91 Super Cup
Uhuru Cup
Zimbabwe National Army Charity Shield

CONCACAF (North American, Central American, and Caribbean competitions)
This section lists competitions overseen either by CONCACAF (Confederation of North, Central America, and Caribbean Association Football) or its member federations.

National teams
CONCACAF Gold Cup
CONCACAF Nations League: also determine qualify for the next edition of the CONCACAF Gold Cup. ; in the top league, League A, the winners of each groups go on to play in the CONCACAF Nations League Finals.
CONCACAF Cup: defunct
CONCACAF Men's Olympic Qualifying
CONCACAF Under-20 Championship: Linked with Qualifiers for the Men's Olympic Football Tournament.
CONCACAF Under-17 Championship
CONCACAF Boys' Under-15 Championship
CONCACAF W Championship: Women's cup ; Linked with Qualifiers for the FIFA Women's World Cup and Women's Olympic Football Tournament.
CONCACAF W Gold Cup: Women's
CONCACAF Women's Olympic Qualifying: Women's
CONCACAF Women's Under-20 Championship: Women's
CONCACAF Women's Under-17 Championship: Women's
CONCACAF Girls' Under-15 Championship: Women's

 Sub-federation competitions 

North American Nations Cup: defunct
Copa Centroamericana: defunct
Caribbean Cup: defunct
Pan American Games
Panamerican Championship: defunct

Clubs
CONCACAF Champions League: 1st-tier cup
CONCACAF Under-13 Champions League: youth
CONCACAF League: defunct
CONCACAF Cup Winners Cup: defunct
CONCACAF Giants Cup: defunct
SuperLiga: defunct
Copa Interamericana: defunct
UNCAF Interclub Cup: defunct

 Sub-federation competitions 

Leagues Cup: Mexico–US cup (NAFU)
Campeones Cup: Mexico-US super cup (NAFU) 
CONCACAF Central American Cup (UNCAF)
UNCAF Interclub Cup: defunct (UNCAF)
CONCACAF Caribbean Club Championship: defunct (CFU)
CONCACAF Caribbean Club Shield: defunct (CFU)

Anguilla

Leagues
 AFA Senior Male League: 1st-tier
 AFA Senior Female League

Cups

 AFA Knockout Cup

Antigua and Barbuda

Leagues
 Antigua and Barbuda Premier Division: 1st-tier
: 2nd-tier

Cups
 Antigua and Barbuda FA Cup: National cup

Aruba

Leagues
 Aruban Division di Honor: 1st-tier
 Aruban Division Uno: 2nd-tier
 Aruban Division Dos: 3rd-tier
 Aruban Liga Hubenil

Cups
 Torneo Copa Betico Croes: National cup

 Bahamas 

Leagues

 BFA Senior League: 1st-tier
 Grand Bahama Football League: 2nd-tier
 New Providence Football League: 2nd-tier

Cups

 Bahamas President's Cup: National cup 
 Grand Bahama FA Cup
 New Providence FA Cup

 Barbados 

Leagues

 Barbados Premier League: 1st-tier
 Barbados Division One: 2nd-tier
 Barbados Division Two: 3rd-tier

Cups

 Barbados FA Cup: National cup

Belize

Leagues

Premier League of Belize: 1st-tier
Belize Premier Football League: defunct
Super League of Belize: defunct

 Bermuda 

Leagues

 Bermudian Premier Division: 1st-tier
 Bermuda First Division: 2nd-tier

Cups

 Bermuda FA Cup: National cup

 Bonaire 

Leagues

Bonaire League: 1st-tier

Cups

 Kopa MCB: National cup

 British Virgin Islands 

Leagues

 BVIFA National Football League: 1st-tier
 Tortola League
 Virgin Gorda League

Cups

 Terry Evans Knockout Cup
 Wendol Williams Cup

 Canada 

Leagues

Cups

 Canadian Championship: National cup for professional and semi-professional teams; determines one of the country's qualifiers for the CONCACAF Champions League.
 Challenge Trophy: National cup for amateur teams.

 Cayman Islands 

Leagues

Cayman Islands Premier League: 1st-tier
: 2nd-tier

Cups

Cayman Islands FA Cup: National cup 
Cayman Islands Digicel Cup

Costa Rica

Leagues
 Liga FPD: 1st-tier
 Liga de Ascenso: 2nd-tier
 Linafa: 3rd-tier
 Costa Rican women's football championship

Cups
 Costa Rican Cup: National cup
 Supercopa de Costa Rica: Super cup

Cuba

Leagues
 Campeonato Nacional de Fútbol de Cuba: 1st-tier
 Torneo de Ascenso

 Curaçao 

Leagues

 Curaçao Promé Divishon: 1st-tier
 Sekshon Amatùr

 Dominica 

Leagues

Dominica Premiere League: 1st-tier
Dominica First Division: 2nd-tier

Cups

CFU Club Championship

Dominican Republic

Leagues

Liga Dominicana de Fútbol: 1st-tier
Primera División de Republica Dominicana: defunct

Cups

 Copa Dominicana de Fútbol: National cup

El Salvador

Leagues
 Salvadoran Primera División: 1st-tier
 Segunda División de Fútbol Salvadoreño: 2nd-tier
 Tercera Division de Fútbol Salvadoreño: 3rd-tier
 Salvadoran women's football championship

Cups
 Copa Presidente: National cup

 French Guiana 

Leagues

French Guiana Honor Division: 1st-tier
French Guiana Promotion of Honor: 2nd-tier

Cups

 Coupe de Guyane: National cup

Guatemala

Leagues
 Liga Nacional de Fútbol de Guatemala: 1st-tier
 Primera División de Ascenso: 2nd-tier
 Segunda División de Ascenso: 3rd-tier
 Guatemalan women's football championship

Cups
 Copa de Guatemala: National cup

 Grenada 

Leagues

 GFA Premier Division: 1st-tier
 GFA First Division: 2nd-tier
 GFA Second Division: 3rd-tier

Cups

 GFA Super Knockout Cup: National cup

 Guadeloupe 

Leagues

 Guadeloupe Division of Honor: 1st-tier
 Guadalupe Honorary Promotion Championship: 2nd-tier

Cups

 Coupe de Guadeloupe: National cup
 Coupe de France

 Guyana 

Leagues

 GFF National Super League: 1st-tier
 Guyana FA Divisions: 2nd-tier

Cups
 Guyana Mayors Cup: National cup 
 GFF Super 8 Cup
 Georgetown Regional Cup

Haiti

Leagues
 Ligue Haitienne: 1st-tier

Cups
 Coupe d'Haïti: National cup

Honduras

Leagues

 Liga Nacional de Fútbol Profesional de Honduras: 1st-tier
 Liga Nacional de Ascenso de Honduras: 2nd-tier
 Liga Mayor de Futbol de Honduras: 3rd-tier

Cups
 Honduran Cup: National cup
 Honduran Supercup: Super cup

Jamaica

Leagues
Jamaica National Premier League: first level
KSAFA Super League: second level
South Central Confederation Super League: second level
Eastern Confederation Super League: second level
Western Confederation Super League: second level

Cups
 JFF Champions Cup: National cup

 Martinique 

Leagues

 Martinique Championnat National: 1st-tier
 Martinique Promotion d'Honneur: 2nd-tier

Cups

 Coupe de la Martinique: National cup 
 Coupe de France

Mexico

 Montserrat 

Leagues

Montserrat Championship: 1st-tier

Nicaragua

Leagues

Nicaraguan Primera División: 1st-tier
Segunda División de Nicaragua: 2nd-tier
Tercera Division de Nicaragua: 3rd-tier
Nicaraguan women's football championship

Cups

Copa de Nicaragua: National cup

Panama

Leagues

Liga Panameña de Fútbol: 1st-tier
Liga Nacional de Ascenso: 2nd-tier
Copa Rommel Fernández: 3rd-tier

Cups

Copa Panamá: National cup

Puerto Rico

Leagues

Liga Puerto Rico: 1st-tier
Puerto Rico Soccer League
Liga Mayor de Fútbol Nacional: defunct
Campeonato Nacional de Fútbol de Puerto Rico: defunct
Liga Nacional de Fútbol de Puerto Rico: defunct

Cups

Torneo de Copa de Puerto Rico
Copa Luis Villarejo: National cup 
Puerto Rico Soccer League Regular Season Cup
Puerto Rico Soccer League PlayOff Cup
Puerto Rico Cup of Excellence

Saint Kitts and Nevis

Leagues

SKNFA Super League: 1st-tier
SKNFA Division 1: 2nd-tier

Cups

Saint Kitts and Nevis National Cup: National cup

Saint Lucia

Leagues

SLFA First Division: 1st-tier
SLFA Second Division: 2nd-tier

Cups

Saint Lucia FA Cup: National cup
SLFA President's Cup

Saint-Martin

Leagues

Saint-Martin Senior League: 1st-tier

Cups

Coupe des Îles du Nord
Coupe de Saint-Martin

Saint Vincent and the Grenadines

Leagues

Saint Vincent and the Grenadines Football Federation

Sint Maarten

Leagues

Sint Maarten Senior League: 1st-tier

Suriname

Leagues

SVB Eerste Divisie: 1st-tier
SVB Tweede Divisie: 2nd-tier
SVB Derde Divisie: 3rd-tier

Cups

Beker van Suriname: National cup 
Suriname President's Cup: Super cup

Turks and Caicos Islands

Leagues

Provo Premier League: 1st-tier

Cups

Turks and Caicos FA Cup

Trinidad and Tobago

Leagues

TT Pro League: 1st-tier
TT Super League: 2nd-tier
Tobago Premier Division

Cups

Trinidad and Tobago FA Trophy: National cup 
Trinidad and Tobago Charity Shield: Super cup
Trinidad and Tobago League Cup
Trinidad and Tobago Classic
Trinidad and Tobago Goal Shield
Trinidad and Tobago Pro Bowl
Trinidad and Tobago Super League Cup

U.S Virgin Islands

Leagues
U.S. Virgin Islands Championship: 1st-tier
St Croix Soccer League: 2nd-tier
St Thomas League: 2nd-tier

United States

Outdoor

Indoor

CONMEBOL (South American competitions)
This section lists the competitions ruled by the CONMEBOL (Confederación Sudamericana de Fútbol), or by federations member the CONMEBOL.

 National teams 

CONMEBOL Copa América
CONMEBOL Preolímpico: Olympic/Under-23 team ; Linked with Qualifiers for the Men's Olympic Football Tournament.
CONMEBOL Sudamericano Sub20 
CONMEBOL Sudamericano Sub17
CONMEBOL Sudamericano Sub15
CONMEBOL Copa América Femenina: Women's cup ; Linked with Qualifiers for the FIFA Women's World Cup and Women's Olympic Football Tournament.
CONMEBOL Sudamericano Sub20 Femenino: Women's
CONMEBOL Sudamericano Sub17 Femenino: Women's
Pan American Games
Superclásico de las Américas: defunct - tournament between Brazil and Argentina
Panamerican Championship: defunct

 Clubs 

CONMEBOL Libertadores: 1st-tier cup
CONMEBOL Sudamericana: 2nd-tier cup
CONMEBOL Recopa: Super cup
CONMEBOL Libertadores Femenina: Women's cup
Supercopa Libertadores: defunct
Copa Conmebol: defunct
Copa Mercosur: defunct
Copa Merconorte: defunct
Copa Simón Bolívar: defunct
Copa Ganadores de Copa: defunct
Copa Interamericana: defunct
Copa de Oro: defunct
Copa Master de CONMEBOL: defunct
Copa Master de Supercopa: defunct
Copa Iberoamericana: defunct
Intercontinental Champions' Supercup: defunct
South American Championship of Champions: defunct
J.League Cup / Copa Sudamericana Championship: defunct
Intercontinental Cup: defunct

 Argentina 

 Bolivia 

 Brazil 

State Championships

North

Campeonato Acreano
Campeonato Amazonense
Campeonato Roraimense
Campeonato Paraense
Campeonato Rondoniense
Campeonato Tocantinense
Campeonato Amapaense

Northeast

Campeonato Baiano
Campeonato Pernambucano
Campeonato Alagoano
Campeonato Sergipano
Campeonato Potiguar
Campeonato Maranhense
Campeonato Piauiense
Campeonato Cearense
Campeonato Paraibano

Midwest

Campeonato Matogrossense
Campeonato Sul-Matogrossense
Campeonato Goiano
Campeonato Brasiliense

Southeast

Campeonato Paulista
Campeonato Carioca
Campeonato Mineiro
Campeonato Capixaba

South

Campeonato Gaúcho
Campeonato Catarinense
Campeonato Paranaense

 Chile 

 Colombia 

 Ecuador 

 Paraguay 

 Peru 

 Uruguay 

 Venezuela 

OFC (Oceanian competitions)
This section lists the competitions ruled by the OFC (Oceania Football Confederation), or by federations member the OFC.

National teams

OFC Nations Cup
Pacific Games
OFC Men's Olympic Qualifier
OFC U-19 Championship
OFC U-16 Championship
OFC Women's Nations Cup: Women's cup ; Linked with Qualifiers for the FIFA Women's World Cup and Women's Olympic Football Tournament.
OFC U-19 Women's Championship: Women's
OFC U-16 Women's Championship: Women's
Wantok Cup: defunct
Polynesia Cup: defunct
Melanesia Cup: defunct

League
OFC Professional League (planned for 2025)

Clubs

OFC Champions League
Oceania Cup Winners' Cup: defunct
OFC President's Cup: defunct
Melanesian Super Cup: defunct

American Samoa

Cook Islands

Leagues

Cook Islands Round Cup: 1st-tier

Cups

Cook Islands Cup: National cup

Fiji

Leagues

Fiji Premier League: 1st-tier
Fiji Senior League: 2nd-tier
Inter-District Championship
Club Franchise League

Cups

FF Cup: National cup 
Fiji Battle of the Giants
Fiji Champion versus Champion: Super cup
Girmit Soccer Tournament

Kiribati

Leagues

Kiribati National Championship: 1st-tier

New Caledonia

Leagues

New Caledonia Super Ligue: 1st-tier
New Caledonia Second Level: 2nd-tier

Cups

Coupe de Calédonie: National cup

New Zealand

Papua New Guinea

Leagues

Papua New Guinea National Soccer League: 1st-tier
Papua New Guinea National Club Championship: Amateur division

Cups
Papua New Guinea FA Cup: National cup

Samoa

Leagues

Samoa National League: 1st-tier

Cups

Samoa Cup: National cup

Solomon Islands

Leagues

Solomon Islands S-League: 1st-tier
Honiara FA League
The Solomon Islands Knockout Championship
Solomon Islands National Club Championship (2000–10)
Interprovincial Tournament 1977-1985

Cups

Solomon Cup: National cup
Malaita Cup

Tahiti

Leagues

Tahitian Ligue 1: 1st-tier
Tahitian Ligue 2: 2nd-tier

Cups

Tahiti Cup: National cup
Tahiti Coupe des Champions: Super cup

Tonga

Leagues

Tonga Major League: 1st-tier
Tonga Division II: 2nd-tier

Cups

Tonga Cup: National cup

Tuvalu

Leagues

Tuvalu A-Division League: 1st-tier
Tuvalu B-Division League: 2nd-tier
Tuvalu A-Division League (women's)

Cups

Taganoa Cup
NBT Cup: National cup
Independence Cup
Christmas Cup
Tuvalu Games Football Cup

Vanuatu

Leagues

Port Vila Football League
Port Vila Premier League: 1st-tier
Port Vila First Division: 2nd-tier
Port Vila Second Division: 3rd-tier
VFF National Super League

Cups

Port Vila Shield
Port Vila FA Cup: National cup

UEFA (European competitions)
This section lists the competitions ruled by the UEFA (Union of European Football Associations), or by federations member the UEFA.

National teams

Clubs

Albania

Andorra

Armenia

Austria

Azerbaijan

Belarus

Belgium

Bosnia and Herzegovina

Bulgaria

Croatia

Cyprus

Czech Republic

Denmark

England

Estonia

Leagues

 Meistriliiga: Men's 1st-tier league
 Esiliiga: Men's 2nd-tier league
 Esiliiga B: Men's 3rd-tier league
 III liiga: Men's 4th-tier league
 IV Liiga: Men's 5th-tier league
 Naiste Meistriliiga: Women's 1st-tier league

Cups

 Estonian Cup: Men's National cup
 Estonian Supercup: Men's super cup
 Estonian Small Cup: Men's lower league cup
 Estonian Women's Cup: Women's National cup

Faroe Islands

Leagues

Faroe Islands Premier League: 1st-tier
1. Deild: 2nd-tier
2. Deild: 3rd-tier
3. Deild: 4th-tier
1. delid kvinnur: Women's league

Cups

Faroe Islands Cup: National cup
Faroe Islands Super Cup: Super cup
FSF Trophy: defunct
Faroese Women's Cup
Faroese Women's Super Cup

Finland

France

Georgia

Leagues

Erovnuli Liga: 1st-tier
Erovnuli Liga 2: 2nd-tier
Georgian Liga 3: 3rd-tier
Liga 4: 4th-tier
Regionuli Liga: 5th-tier
Women's football championship

Cups

Georgian Cup: National cup 
Georgian Super Cup: Super cup

Germany

Gibraltar

Leagues

Gibraltar National League: 1st-tier
Gibraltar Premier Division: defunct
Gibraltar Second Division: defunct
Gibraltar Intermediate League
Gibraltar women's football championship

Cups

Rock Cup: National cup
Pepe Reyes Cup: Super cup
Gibraltar Division 2 Cup: defunct
Gibraltar Intermediate Cup
Gibraltar Premier Cup: defunct
Women's Rock Cup

Greece

Hungary

Leagues

NBI: 1st-tier
NBII: 2nd-tier
NBIII: 3rd-tier
Megyei Bajnokság I: 4th-tier
Megyei Bajnokság II: 5th-tier
Női NB I: Women's league

Cups

Magyar Kupa: National cup
Szuperkupa: Super cup
Hungarian Women's Cup

Iceland

Leagues

Men's
Úrvalsdeild karla: 1st-tier
1. deild karla: 2nd-tier
2. deild karla: 3rd-tier
3. deild karla: 4th-tier
4. deild karla: 5th-tier
Women's
Úrvalsdeild kvenna
1. deild kvenna
2. deild kvenna

Cups

Men's
Icelandic Men's Football Cup: National cup
Icelandic Men's Football Super Cup: Super cup
Icelandic Men's Football League Cup: Pre-season cup
Fótbolti.net Cup: Annual pre-season tournament
Reykjavik Tournament: Annual pre-season tournament
Women's
Icelandic Women's Football Cup
Icelandic Women's Super Cup
Icelandic Women's Football League Cup

Israel

LeaguesMenLigat Ha`Al: the top division operates at the national level and has 14 member clubs
Liga Leumit: the 2nd division operates at the national level and has 16 member clubs
Liga Alef: the 3rd division is split into 2 regional leagues (north and south) and has 32 member clubs (16 in each division)
Liga Bet: the 4th division is split into 4 regional leagues (2 in the north, 2 in the south) and has 64 member clubs (16 in each division)
Liga Gimel: the 5th division is split into 6 regional leagues and has 94 member clubsWomenLigat Nashim Rishona: the top division operates at the national level and has 8 member clubs
Ligat Nashim Shniya: the 2nd division operates at the national level and has 5 member clubsYouthNoar Premier League: the top division operates at the national level and has 16 member clubs
Noar Leumit League: the 2nd division is split into 2 regional leagues (north and south).
Noar Arzit: the 3rd division is split into 2 regional leagues (north and south).

CupsMenIsrael State Cup: National cup
Israel Super Cup: Super cup
Toto Cup: one for each of the top 2 divisions. (Ligat Ha`Al and Liga Leumit)WomenIsraeli Women's CupYouthIsrael Noar State Cup

Italy

Kazakhstan

Leagues

Kazakhstan Premier League: 1st-tier
Kazakhstan First Division: 2nd-tier
Kazakhstan Second League: 3rd-tier

Cups

Kazakhstan Cup: National cup
Kazakhstan Super Cup: Super cup

Women competitions

 Kazakhstani women's football championship
 Kazakhstani Women's Cup

Kosovo

Latvia

Leagues

Virsliga: 1st-tier
1. līga: 2nd-tier
2. līga: 3rd-tier
Rigas cempionats
Kurzemes zona
Latgales zona
Vidzemes zona
Livonijas liga
Latvian Women's League

Cups

Latvijas kauss: National cup
Latvian Supercup: Super cup
Virsligas Winter Cup: Defunct

Liechtenstein

Liechtenstein Cup—This is the only competition exclusively featuring clubs from Liechtenstein. All seven clubs in the country play their league football in the Swiss league system.

Lithuania

Luxembourg

Leagues

Luxembourg National Division: 1st-tier
Luxembourg Division of Honour: 2nd-tier
Luxembourg 1. Division: 3rd-tier
Luxembourg 2. Division: 4th-tier
Luxembourg 3. Division: 5th-tier
Dames Ligue 1: Women's league

Cups

Luxembourg Cup: National cup
Luxembourg Women's Cup

Malta

Leagues

Maltese Football League
Maltese Premier League: 1st-tier
Maltese Challenge League: 2nd-tier
Maltese National Amateur League: 3rd-tierFor Gozo competitions, see non FIFA competitions sectionCups

Maltese FA Trophy: National cup
Maltese Super Cup: Super cup

Moldova

Montenegro

Netherlands

Northern Ireland

Leagues

Irish Football League
Irish Premiership: 1st-tier
NIFL Championship: 2nd-tier
NIFL Premier Intermediate League: 3rd-tier

Cups

Irish Cup: National cup
Northern Ireland Football League Cup: League cup
NIFL Charity Shield: Super cup
County Antrim Shield
Mid-Ulster Cup
North West Senior Cup
Irish Intermediate Cup
Steel & Sons Cup
Bob Radcliffe Cup
Craig Memorial Cup
George Wilson Cup

North Macedonia

Leagues

1. MFL: 1st-tier
2. MFL: 2nd-tier
3. MFL: 3rd-tier
Macedonian Regional Football Leagues: 4th/5th-tier
Macedonian women's football championship

Cups

Macedonian Football Cup: National cup
Macedonian Supercup: Super cup
Macedonian Women's Football Cup

Norway

Poland

Portugal

Republic of Ireland

Leagues

League of Ireland Premier Division: 1st-tier
League of Ireland First Division: 2nd-tier
Women's National League

Cups

 FAI Cup: National cup
 League of Ireland Cup: League cup
 President of Ireland's Cup: Super cup
Leinster Senior Cup
Munster Senior Cup
FAI Women's Cup

Romania

Russia

San Marino

Leagues

Campionato Sammarinese di Calcio: 1st-tier

Cups

Coppa Titano: National cup
Super Coppa Sammarinese: Super cup
Trofeo Federale: defunct
Torneo Repubblica di San Marino - Defunct friendly tournament held in San MarinoScotland

Serbia

Slovakia

Leagues

Fortuna Liga: 1st-tier
2. liga: 2nd-tier
3. liga: 3rd-tier
Bratislava
Západ: West
Stred: Central
Východ: East
4. liga: 4th-tiereight groups5. liga: 5th-tier
Slovak Women's First League

Cups

Slovak Cup: National cup
Slovak Super Cup: Super cup
Slovak Women's Cup

Slovenia

Leagues

1.SNL: 1st-tier
2.SNL: 2nd-tier
3.SNL: 3rd-tier
3.SNL-zahod
3.SNL-vzhod
Slovenian Regional Leagues: 4th-tier
Regional FA Leagues
Slovenian Women's League

Cups

Hervis Pokal: National cup
Slovenian Women's Cup

Spain

Sweden

Leagues

Allsvenskan: 1st-tier
Superettan: 2nd-tier
Division 1: 3rd-tier
Division 2: 4th-tier
Division 3: 5th-tier
Division 4: 6th-tier
Division 5: 7th-tier
Division 6: 8th-tier
Division 7: 9th-tier
Division 8: 10th-tier
Damallsvenskan: women's premier league

Cups

Svenska Cupen: National cup
Svenska Cupen (women)

Switzerland

Leagues

Swiss Super League: 1st-tier
Swiss Challenge League: 2nd-tier
Swiss Promotion League: 3rd-tier
Swiss 1. Liga: 4th-tier
2. Liga Interregional: 5th-tier
2. Liga: 6th-tier
3. Liga: 7th-tier
4. Liga: 8th-tier
5. Liga: 9th-tier
Nationalliga A: women's football
Nationalliga B

Cups

Schweizer Cup: National cup
Uhrencup
Cup of the Alps
Swiss League Cup: defunct
Swiss Super Cup: defunct
Swiss Women's Cup

Turkey

Ukraine

Wales

Leagues

Cymru Premier: 1st-tier
Cymru North: 2nd-tier
Cymru South: 2nd-tier
Ardal Leagues: 3rd-tier
North East
North West
South East
South West
Area leagues: 4th-tier
Welsh Premier Women's Football League

Cups

Welsh Cup: National cup
FAW Premier Cup
Welsh League Cup
FAW Trophy
Welsh Football League Cup
Cymru Alliance League Cup
FAW Women's Cup
FAW Welsh Youth Cup

Non-FIFA competitions
This section lists the competitions ruled by associations outside FIFA or its confederations. This includes nations, territories, regions and dependencies. This does not include competitions in continental confederations who may not be a part of FIFA.

 Worldwide 

Clericus Cup, organised by Centro Sportivo Italiano
ConIFA World Football Cup, organised by Confederation of Independent Football Associations
Viva World Cup, organised by New Federation Board
FIFI Wild Cup, organised by Federation of International Football Independents
Island Games
UNPO Cup, organised by Unrepresented Nations and Peoples Organization
Europeada, organised by Federal Union of European Nationalities
ELF Cup, organised by Cyprus Turkish Football Federation
Homeless World Cup
Unofficial Football World Championships
Women's Unofficial Football World Championships: Women's

 Abkhazia 
 Leagues 

Abkhazian Premier League: 1st-tier

 Cups 

 Abkhazian Cup: National cup
 Abkhazia Super Cup: Super cup

 Republic of Artsakh 
 Leagues 

Artsakh Football League: 1st-tier

 Cups 

Artsakh Cup

 Ascension Island 
 Leagues 

Ascension Island Football League: 1st-tier

 Cups 

Ascension Island League Cup
Ascension Island District Cup
J. Lawrence Knock-out Cup
Flipper Cup

 Canada 

 Leagues 
Canadian Soccer League
CSL First Division: 1st-tier
CSL Second Division: 2nd-tier

 Cups 

Canadian Soccer League championship final
Open Canada Cup: Defunct

 Christmas Island 
 Leagues 

Christmas Island Soccer League

 Crimea 
 Leagues 

 Crimean Premier League: 1st-tier

 Donetsk People's Republic 
 Leagues 

Master-Torg DPR Premier League: 1st-tier

 Falkland islands 
 Leagues 

Falkland Islands Football League: 1st-tier

 Federated States of Micronesia 

Pohnpei Premier League
Micronesian Games Football Tournament

 Gozo 
 Leagues 

Gozo Football League First Division: 1st-tier
Gozo Football League Second Division: 2nd-tier
Gozo Football Female League

 Cups 

G.F.A. Cup: National cup
Independence Cup
Freedom Day Cup
Second Division Knock-Out

 Greenland 

 Leagues 

Greenlandic Men's Football Championship: 1st-tier
Greenlandic Women's Football Championship

 Cups 

Greenland Cup

 Guernsey 
 Leagues 

Priaulx League: 1st-tier
FNB Jackson League: 1st-tier
Railway League 1
Railway League 2
Guernsey Veterans League
Guernsey Women's League

 Cups 

Guernsey FA Cup
Frederick Martinez Cup
Stranger Charity Cup
Mauger Cup
Rouget Cup
Rawlinson Cup
Le Vallee Cup
Upton Park Trophy - Held between champions of Guernsey and champions of Jersey 
Guernsey Women's Knock-out Cup
Guernsey Women's Secondary Cup

 Iraqi Kurdistan 
 Leagues 

Kurdistan Premier League: 1st-tier

 Cups 

 Kurdistan Cup
 Kurdistan Super Cup

 Isle of Man 

 Leagues 

Isle of Man Football League
Isle of Man Premier League: 1st-tier
Isle of Man Division 2: 2nd-tier
Isle of Man Football Combination

 Cups 

Isle of Man FA Cup: National cup
Isle of Man Hospital Cup
Isle of Man Railway Cup
Isle of Man Gold Cup
Isle of Man Woods Memorial Cup
Isle of Man Charity Shield: Super cup

 Isles of Scilly 
 Leagues 

Isles of Scilly Football League: 1st-tier

 Cups 

Wholesalers Cup
Foredeck Cup

 Jersey 
 Leagues 

Jersey Football Combination: 1st-tier
Jersey Championship: 2nd-tier

 Cups 

Le Riche Cup: Domestic cup
Wheway Trophy: JFC league cup
Jersey Charity Cup: Community/charity trophy
 Alex Scott Cup
 Brian Beckett Cup
 Colin Welsh cup
 Cory Cup
 David Melton Memorial Trophy
 Eric Amy Cup
 G4S Cup
 Jason Lee Memorial Trophy
 Lady Bingham Cup
 Presidents Trophy
 Riche Broken Memorial Cup
 Touzel Cup
 Tradesmen Trophy
 Tregear Cup
 Trinity Shield
 Willis Cup
 Zenith Cup
Upton Park Trophy - Held between champions of Guernsey and champions of Jersey

 Luhansk People's Republic 
 Leagues 
Luhansk Football League

 Marshall Islands 
 Leagues 

Marshallese Soccer League

 Mayotte 

 Leagues 

Mayotte Division Honneur: 1st-tier

 Cups 

Coupe de Mayotte

 Mexico 

 Competitions 

Liga de Balompié Mexicano

 Monaco 

 Competitions 

Challenge Prince Rainier III: 1st-tier
Trophée Ville de Monaco: 2nd-tier
Challenge Monégasque: 3rd-tier

 Nauru 
 Leagues 

Nauru Soccer League

 Niue 

 Leagues 

Niue Soccer Tournament: 1st-tier

 Northern Cyprus 

 Leagues 

KTFF Süper Lig (English: CTFA Super League): 1st-tier
KTFF 1. Lig: 2nd-tier
KTFF 2. Lig: 3rd-tier
KTFF Womens League

 Cups 

Cypriot Cup: National cup
KTFF Super Cup: Super cup

 Palau 

 Leagues 

Palau Soccer League: 1st-tier
Palau Youth Soccer League

 Sahrawi Arab Democratic Republic Also known as Western Sahara Cups 

Sahrawi Republic Cup

 Saint Barthélemy 

 Leagues 

Saint-Barthelemy Championships: 1st-tier

 Cups 

Coupe de Saint-Barth
Trophée José da Silva

 Saint Helena 
 Leagues 

St. Helena Island Football League: 1st-tierDivision 2Division 3 Saint Pierre and Miquelon 

 Leagues 

Ligue de Football de Saint Pierre et Miquelon: 1st-tier

 Somaliland 
 Leagues 

Somaliland Football League

 Cups 

Telesom Cup
Somaliland Regional Games

 South Ossetia 
 Leagues 

South Ossetian Football League
South Ossetia Youth League

 Tokelau 
 Leagues See Soccer in Tokelau. Tuvalu 

 Leagues 

Tuvalu A-Division League: 1st-tier
Tuvalu B-Division League: 2nd-tier
Tuvalu A-Division League (women's)

 Cups 

Taganoa Cup
NBT Cup: National cup
Independence Cup
Christmas Cup
Tuvalu Games Football Cup

 Vatican City 
 Leagues 

Vatican City Championship: 1st-tier

 Cups 

Coppa Sergio Valci: National cup
Supercoppa: Super cup
Other - Clericus Cup

 Wallis and Futuna 
 Leagues 

Wallis Première Division
Wallis Deuxième Division
Futuna Première Division
Futuna Deuxième Division

 Cups 

 Coupe de l'Outre-Mer: Defunct 
 Outremer Champions Cup: Both of these cups were held for territories of France, both are now defunct Competitions in former nations 
This section lists competitions in former nations, unions, empires, protectorates and territories, all of which are defunct.

 Austria-Hungary 
 Leagues 

Tagblatt Pokal

 Cups 

Austria-Hungary Challenge Cup

 Commonwealth of Independent States 

 CIS Super League: Proposed
 United Tournament
 United Supercup

 Czechoslovakia 
 Leagues 

Czechoslovak First League
Czechoslovak Second League
Czechoslovak Third League

 Cups 

Czechoslovak Cup

 German Democratic Republic Also known as East Germany 

 Leagues 

DDR-Oberliga
DDR-Liga Staffel A
DDR-Liga Staffel B
II. DDR-Liga
 Bezirksliga: 15 Regional leagues Bezirksliga Schwerin
 Bezirksliga Rostock
 Bezirksliga Neubrandenburg
 Bezirksliga Magdeburg
 Bezirksliga Potsdam
 Bezirksliga Berlin
 Bezirksliga Frankfurt/Oder
 Bezirksliga Cottbus
 Bezirksliga Halle
 Bezirksliga Gera
 Bezirksliga Erfurt
 Bezirksliga Dresden
 Bezirksliga Leipzig
 Bezirksliga Karl-Marx-Stadt / Chemnitz
 Bezirksliga Suhl

 Cups 

FDGB-Pokal
DFV-Supercup

 Mandatory Palestine 
 Leagues 

Mandatory Palestine League: 1923-1947
Palestine Premier League (1945-1947)
Mis'chakei HaBechora
Haifa League
Jerusalem Services and Police League
Jerusalem League: 1940
Liga Bet (Division 2)
Samaria Division
Sharon Division
Liga Gimel (Division 3)
Palestine Youth League

 Cups 

Palestine Cup (1922-1947)
Hebrew Cup: 1922-1925
People's Cup (1928)
Tel Aviv District Cup
Palestine Mond Cup
Jerusalem Cup
Nashashibi Cup
Jaffa Mayor Cup
Mr. Guth Cup
Melchett Cup
Palestine Autumn Cup
Palestine National Shield
Nesher Cup: Cup for winners of the Samaria and Sharon Divisions
Haifa Cup: Following the cancellation of the Haifa league
Palestine North Cup
Jezreel Valley Cup
Jordan Valley Cup
The Wartime Cup

 Netherlands Antilles 
 Leagues 

Netherlands Antilles Championship

 North Vietnam 
 Leagues 

North Vietnam V-League

 Ottoman Empire The İstanbul Lig and İstanbul Profesyonel Futbol Ligi ran after the collapse of the Ottoman Empire but continued under the Constantinople Football League and has since been defunct. Leagues 

Constantinople Football League
 İstanbul Pazar Ligi
 İstanbul Cuma Ligi
 İstanbul Ligi
 İstanbul Profesyonel Futbol Ligi

 People's Democratic Republic of Yemen 
 Leagues 

South Yemeni League

 Cups 

South Yemen Cup

 Saar Protectorate 

 Amateurliga Saarland: The representing league of the Saar Protectorate 1947–1956, of Saarland, Germany Serbia and Montenegro 
 Leagues 

First League of Serbia and Montenegro
Second League of Serbia and Montenegro
Serbian First League (2004-2006)
Montenegrin First League (2004-2006)

 Cups 

Serbia and Montenegro Cup

 South Vietnam 
 Leagues 

South Vietnam V-League
South Vietnam V-League Division 2

 Cups 

South Vietnam League Cup

 Soviet Union Also known as the USSR. See also: Soviet Union football league system Leagues 

Soviet Top League
Soviet First League
Soviet Second League
Soviet Second League B

 Cups 

Soviet Cup
Soviet Super Cup
USSR Federation Cup
All-Union Committee of Physical Culture and Sports Tournament
Soviet Season Opener Cup
Nedel Cup
USSR 60th Anniversary Cup
Valentin Granatkin Memorial Tournament
Snowdrop Tournament
Soviet Sport Prize

 Yemen Arab Republic Also known as North Yemen''

Leagues 

North Yemeni League

Cups 

North Yemen Cup of the Republic

Yugoslavia

Leagues 

Yugoslav First League
Yugoslav Second League
Yugoslav Third League
 Yugoslav Republic Regional Leagues

Cups 

Yugoslav Cup
Yugoslav Super Cup

See also
Geography of association football
Geography of women's association football
International competitions in women's football
List of association football clubs
List of men's national association football teams
List of women's national association football teams
Exhibition/charity/legends/friendly/preseason
 match
Playoffs/postseason/finals
:Category:Charity football matches
:Category:Football combination XI teams
List of futsal competitions
Beach Soccer Worldwide

References

External links
 FIFA official website
Soccerway.com
Scoresway
FastScore
LiveScore
ESPN
Flashscore.com
Global Sports Archive
FUTBOL24.com
AiScore
AzscoreGB
Playmakerstats.com
Footballdatabase.eu
Live scores – 1xBET
The RSSSF -- Rec.Sport.Soccer Statistics Foundation.

Competitions
Association football